Sam Liam Din Daeng or Din Daeng Junction is a road junction in the area of Thanon Phaya Thai Subdistrict, Ratchathewi District in downtown Bangkok. It is a three-way junction of Ratchawithi Road, Ratchaprarop Road and Din Daeng Road, being considered the beginning of the former two. The name of the junction refers to its triangular shape (sam liam, สามเหลี่ยม is Thai for triangle). On top of the junction is an overpass linking Ratchawithi Road and the nearby Victory Monument zone. 

It is often confused with the similarly-named next junction, Tai Duan Din Daeng Junction in Din Daeng District, where Din Daeng Road meets Vibhavadi Rangsit Road. Tai Duan Din Daeng features both an overpass and a tunnel.

Sam Liam Din Daeng is usually one of the areas with the highest amount of traffic violations in Bangkok. in May 2018, CCTV was installed here along with other 14 intersections where traffic violations were high. On the second day after the installation, there were 3,524 offenders.

Incidents 
The Sam Liam Din Daeng area, including Tai Duan Din Daeng Junction, was one among many protest sites during the "Bloody Songkran" political unrest of April 2009, which saw crackdowns by the government of Abhisit Vejjajiva against demonstrations by United Front of Democracy Against Dictatorship (UDD), also known as the Red Shirts. Protesters in this area were tear gassed after seizing a gas truck. Sam Liam Din Daeng once again became a UDD protest site the next year, with a number of protesters being injured or killed in the area during the subsequent military crackdowns.

Since August 2021, Sam Liam Din Daeng has been used as a venue for daily evening demonstrations against the government of Gen. Prayut Chan-ocha. Many times the protesters (mostly teenagers but some were members of the Red Shirts) violently clashed with riot police.

Neighbouring places
Victory Monument
Santiphap Park

References 

Ratchathewi district
Road junctions in Bangkok